The 4 arrondissements of the Ain department are:
 Arrondissement of Belley, (subprefecture: Belley) with 104 communes. The population of the arrondissement was 120,594 in 2016.  
 Arrondissement of Bourg-en-Bresse, (prefecture of the Ain department: Bourg-en-Bresse) with 199 communes. The population of the arrondissement was 331,400 in 2016.  
 Arrondissement of Gex, (subprefecture: Gex) with 27 communes. The population of the arrondissement was 93,027 in 2016.  
 Arrondissement of Nantua, (subprefecture: Nantua) with 62 communes. The population of the arrondissement was 93,404 in 2016.

History

In 1800 the arrondissements of Belley, Bourg-en-Bresse, Nantua and Trévoux were created. In 1815  the arrondissement of Gex was created. The arrondissements of Gex and Trévoux were disbanded in 1926. The arrondissement of Gex was restored in 1933. 

The borders of the arrondissements of Ain were modified in January 2017:
 one commune from the arrondissement of Belley to the arrondissement of Nantua 
 12 communes from the arrondissement of Bourg-en-Bresse to the arrondissement of Belley 
 four communes from the arrondissement of Bourg-en-Bresse to the arrondissement of Nantua 
 two communes from the arrondissement of Gex to the arrondissement of Nantua 
 one commune from the arrondissement of Nantua to the arrondissement of Belley

References

Ain